Upper Blue Licks is an unincorporated community located in Nicholas County, Kentucky, United States. Its post office closed in 1873.

Area first discovered by Simon (Butler) Kenton and Thomas Williams.  March, 1775

References

Unincorporated communities in Nicholas County, Kentucky
Unincorporated communities in Kentucky